France competed at the 1988 Summer Olympics in Seoul, South Korea. 266 competitors, 192 men and 74 women, took part in 167 events in 23 sports.

Medalists

Competitors
The following is the list of number of competitors in the Games.

Archery

In France's fourth appearance in modern Olympic archery, no individual archer made it past the quarterfinal.  The women's team made it to the final, placing last there to finish 8th overall, while the men's team was eliminated in the semifinal.

Women's Individual Competition:
 Catherine Pellen — quarterfinal, 14th place
 Nathalie Hibon — preliminary round, 28th place
 Marie-Josée Bazin — preliminary round, 47th place

Men's Individual Competition:
 Olivier Heck — 1/8 final, 19th place
 Thierry Venant — preliminary round, 37th place
 Claude Franclet — preliminary round, 64th place

Women's Team Competition:
 Pellen, Hibon, and Bazin — final, 8th place

Men's Team Competition:
 Heck, Venant, and Franclet — semifinal, 10th place

Athletics

Men's 10.000 metres 
 Jean-Louis Prianon 
 First Round — 28:08.38 
 Final — 27:36.43 (→ 4th place)
 Paul Arpin 
 First Round — 28:25.56 
 Final — 27:39.36 (→ 7th place)

Men's 3.000m Steeplechase
 Raymond Pannier
 Heat — 8:30.94
 Semi Final — 8:19.39
 Final — 8:23.80 (→ 12th place)
 Bruno Le Stum
 Heat — 8:36.95
 Semi Final — 8:26.69 (→ did not advance)

Men's Javelin Throw 
 Charlus Bertimon
 Qualification — 70.84m (→ did not advance)
 Stéphane Laporte
 Qualification — 69.40m (→ did not advance)
 Pascal Lefèvre
 Qualification — 76.42m (→ did not advance)

Men's Discus Throw
 Patrick Journoud
 Qualifying Heat — 58.94m (→ did not advance)

Men's Long Jump 
 Norbert Brige
 Qualification — 8.05m
 Final — 7.97m (→ 7th place)

Men's Decathlon 
 Christian Plaziat — 8272 points (→ 5th place) 
 100 metres — 10.83s
 Long Jump — 7.62m
 Shot Put — 13.58m
 High Jump — 2.12m
 400 metres — 48.34s
 110m Hurdles — 14.18s
 Discus Throw — 43.06m
 Pole Vault — 4.90m
 Javelin Throw — 52.18m
 1.500 metres — 4:34.07s

 Alain Blondel — 8268 points (→ 6th place) 
 100 metres — 11.02s
 Long Jump — 7.43m
 Shot Put — 12.92m
 High Jump — 1.97m
 400 metres — 47.44s
 110m Hurdles — 14.40s
 Discus Throw — 41.20m
 Pole Vault — 5.20m
 Javelin Throw — 57.46m
 1.500 metres — 4:16.64s

Men's 20 km Walk
 Martial Fesselier
 Final — 1:22:43 (→ 16th place)
 Thierry Toutain
 Final — 1:22:55 (→ 18th place)

Men's 50 km Walk
 Alain Lemercier
 Final — 3'50:28 (→ 16th place)
 Jean-Marie Neff
 Final — DSQ (→ no ranking)
 Eric Neisse
 Final — DSQ (→ no ranking)

Women's 4 × 400 m Relay 
 Fabienne Ficher, Nathalie Simon, Evecyne Elien, and Nadine Debois 
 Heat — 3:29.95
 Fabienne Ficher, Simon Fabienne, Debois Nathalie, and Elien Nadine 
 Final — 3:29.37 (→ 7th place)

Women's Marathon
 Françoise Bonnet
 Final — 2"32:36 (→ 14th place)
 Maria Rebelo-Lelut
 Final — 2"33:47 (→ 18th place)
 Jocelyne Villeton
 Final — 2"34:02 (→ 19th place)

Women's Javelin Throw
 Nadine Auzeil
 Qualification — no mark (→ did not advance)

Women's Heptathlon 
 Chantal Beaugeant
 Final Result — 2315 points (→ 28th place)

Boxing

Men's Flyweight (— 51 kg)
 Philippe Desavoye
 First Round — Bye
 Second Round — Defeated Anthony Ikegu (KEN), RSC-2
 Third Round — Lost to Melvin de Leon (DOM), 0:5

Men's Bantamweight (— 54 kg)
 Jean-Marc Augustin
 First Round — Lost to Byun Jong-Il (KOR), 0:5

Men's Light Welterweight (— 63.5 kg)
 Ludovic Proto
 First Round — Defeated Mpuco Makama (SUA), walk-over
 Second Round — Defeated Mark Elliott (GBR), RSC-1
 Third Round — Lost to Vyacheslav Yanovski (URS), 0:5

Men's Welterweight (— 67 kg)
 Laurent Boudouani → Silver Medal
 First Round — Bye
 Second Round — Defeated Imre Bácskai (HUN), 4:1
 Third Round — Defeated Darren Obah (AUS), 5:0
 Quarterfinals — Defeated Song Kyung-Sup (KOR), 3:2
 Semifinals — Defeated Kenneth Gould (USA), 4:1
 Final — Lost to Robert Wangila (KEN), KO-2

Canoeing

Cycling

Sixteen cyclists, twelve men and four women, represented France in 1988.

Men's road race
 Jean-François Laffillé
 Claude Carlin
 Laurent Bezault

Men's team time trial
 Laurent Bezault
 Eric Heulot
 Pascal Lance
 Thierry Laurent

Men's sprint
 Fabrice Colas

Men's 1 km time trial
 Frédéric Magné

Men's team pursuit
 Hervé Dagorné
 Pascal Lino
 Didier Pasgrimaud
 Pascal Potié

Men's points race
 Pascal Lino

Women's road race
 Catherine Marsal
 Jeannie Longo-Ciprelli
 Cécile Odin

Women's sprint
 Isabelle Gautheron

Diving

Equestrianism

Fencing

19 fencers, 14 men and 5 women, represented France in 1988.

Men's foil
 Philippe Omnès
 Laurent Bel
 Patrick Groc

Men's team foil
 Laurent Bel, Patrick Groc, Youssef Hocine, Patrice Lhotellier, Philippe Omnès

Men's épée
 Philippe Riboud
 Éric Srecki
 Jean-Michel Henry

Men's team épée
 Frédéric Delpla, Jean-Michel Henry, Olivier Lenglet, Philippe Riboud, Éric Srecki

Men's sabre
 Jean-François Lamour
 Philippe Delrieu
 Pierre Guichot

Men's team sabre
 Philippe Delrieu, Franck Ducheix, Pierre Guichot, Jean-François Lamour

Women's foil
 Isabelle Spennato
 Brigitte Latrille-Gaudin
 Laurence Modaine-Cessac

Women's team foil
 Brigitte Latrille-Gaudin, Gisèle Meygret, Laurence Modaine-Cessac, Nathalie Pallet, Isabelle Spennato

Gymnastics

Judo

Modern pentathlon

Three male pentathletes represented France in 1988.

Men's Individual Competition:
 Christophe Ruer — 5242 pts (→ 5th place)
 Joël Bouzou — 5198 pts (→ 8th place)
 Bruno Génard — 4828 pts (→ 37th place)

Men's Team Competition:
 Ruer, Bouzou, and Genard — 15268 pts (→ 4th place)

Rhythmic gymnastics

Rowing

Sailing

Shooting

Swimming

Men's 50 m Freestyle
 Stéphan Caron
 Heat — 23.22
 B-Final — scratched (→ no ranking)
 Christophe Kalfayan
 Heat — 23.47
 B-Final — 23.15 (→ 13th place)

Men's 100 m Freestyle
 Stéphan Caron
 Heat — 49.37
 Final — 49.62 (→  Bronze Medal)
 Christophe Kalfayan
 Heat — 51.05 (→ did not advance, 20th place)

Men's 200 m Freestyle
 Stéphan Caron
 Heat — 1:49.66
 B-Final — scratched (→ no ranking)
 Ludovic Depickère
 Heat — 1:53.81 (→ did not advance, 35th place)

Men's 400 m Freestyle
 Franck Iacono
 Heat — 4:00.04 (→ did not advance, 30th place)

Men's 1500 m Freestyle
 Christophe Marchand
 Heat — 15:22.19 (→ did not advance, 12th place)
 Franck Iacono
 Heat — 15:22.66 (→ did not advance, 13th place)

Men's 100 m Backstroke
 Franck Schott
 Heat — 56.76
 B-Final — 56.98 (→ 10th place)
 Renaud Boucher
 Heat — 58.90 (→ did not advance, 31st place)

Men's 200 m Backstroke
 David Holderbach
 Heat — 2:04.83 (→ did not advance, 21st place)

Men's 100 m Breaststroke
 David Leblanc
 Heat — 1:04.56 (→ did not advance, 22nd place)
 Cédric Penicaud
 Heat — 1:05.46 (→ did not advance, 36th place)

Men's 200 m Breaststroke
 Cédric Penicaud
 Heat — 2:18.72
 B-Final — 2:18.95 (→ 16th place)
 David Leblanc
 Heat — DSQ (→ did not advance, no ranking)

Men's 100 m Butterfly
 Ludovic Depickère
 Heat — 56.47 (→ did not advance, 27th place)

Men's 200 m Butterfly
 Christophe Bordeau
 Heat — 2:01.70
 B-Final — 2:01.46 (→ 13th place)

Men's 200 m Individual Medley
 Christophe Bordeau
 Heat — 2:04.95
 B-Final — 2:05.51 (→ 12th place)

Men's 400 m Individual Medley
 Christophe Bordeau
 Heat — 4:23.46
 B-Final — 4:23.39 (→ 10th place)
 Laurent Journet
 Heat — 4:29.03 (→ did not advance, 18th place)

Men's 4 × 100 m Freestyle Relay
 Stéphan Caron, Christophe Kalfayan, Laurent Neuville, and Bruno Gutzeit
 Heat — 3:21.77 
 Final — 3:20.02 (→ 4th place)

Men's 4 × 200 m Freestyle Relay
 Stéphan Caron, Michel Pou, Olivier Fougeroud, and Laurent Neuville
 Heat — 7:23.03
 Michel Pou, Franck Iacono, Olivier Fougeroud, and Ludovic Depickère
 Final — 7:24.69 (→ 7th place)

Men's 4 × 100 m Medley Relay
 Franck Schott, David Leblanc, Ludovic Depickère, and Bruno Gutzeit
 Heat — 3:48.64 (→ did not advance, 10th place)

Women's 50 m Freestyle
 Catherine Plewinski
 Heat — 26.01
 Final — 25.90 (→ 7th place)

Women's 100 m Freestyle
 Catherine Plewinski
 Heat — 55.53
 Final — 55.49 (→  Bronze Medal)
 Jacqueline Délord
 Heat — 58.22 (→ did not advance, 29th place)

Women's 200 m Freestyle
 Cécile Prunier
 Heat — 2:01.60
 Final — 2:02.88 (→ 8th place)

Women's 400 m Freestyle
 Cécile Prunier
 Heat — 4:15.63
 B-Final — 4:21.03 (→ 16th place)

Women's 800 m Freestyle
 Karyn Faure
 Heat — 8:41.64 (→ did not advance, 13th place)
 Cécile Prunier
 Heat — 8:57.22 (→ did not advance, 24th place)

Women's 100 m Backstroke
 Laurence Guillou
 Heat — 1:05.07 (→ did not advance, 20th place)

Women's 200 m Backstroke
 Christine Magnier
 Heat — 2:24.15 (→ did not advance, 25th place)

Women's 100 m Breaststroke
 Pascaline Louvrier
 Heat — 1:13.21 (→ did not advance, 24th place)
 Virginie Bojaryn
 Heat — 1:13.55 (→ did not advance, 26th place)

Women's 200 m Breaststroke
 Virginie Bojaryn
 Heat — 2:37.38 (→ did not advance, 22nd place)
 Pascaline Louvrier
 Heat — 2:38.75 (→ did not advance, 26th place)

Women's 100 m Butterfly
 Catherine Plewinski
 Heat — 59.34
 Final — 59.58 (→ 4th place)
 Jacqueline Délord
 Heat — 1:02.24 
 B-Final — 1:02.45 (→ 11th place)

Women's 200 m Butterfly
 Claire Supiot
 Heat — 2:21.65 (→ did not advance, 25th place)

Women's 400 m Individual Medley
 Christine Magnier
 Heat — 4:51.91
 Final — 4:53.29 (→ 14th place)

Women's 4 × 100 m Medley Relay
 Laurence Guillou, Pascaline Louvrier, Catherine Plewinski, and Jacqueline Délord
 Heat — 4:16.21 (→ did not advance, 10th place)

Synchronized swimming

Three synchronized swimmers represented France in 1988.

Women's solo
 Muriel Hermine
 Anne Capron
 Karine Schuler

Women's duet
 Anne Capron
 Karine Schuler

Table tennis

Tennis

Women's Singles Competition
Catherine Suire
 First Round — Defeated Yayuk Basuki (Indonesia) 6-3, 3-6, 6-0
 Second Round — Defeated Jeong-Myung Lee (South Korea) 7-5, 4-6, 7-5 
 Third Round — Lost to Steffi Graf (West Germany) 3-6, 0-6
Isabelle Demongeot
 First Round — Lost to Jana Novotná (Czechoslovakia) 4-6, 3-6
 Nathalie Tauziat
 First Round — Defeated Carling Bassett-Seguso (Canada) 7-6, 6-1
 Second Round — Lost to Catarina Lindqvist (Sweden) 6-2, 3-6, 4-6

Volleyball

Men's team competition
Preliminary round (group B)
 Defeated the Netherlands (3-1)
 Defeated Tunisia (3-0)
 Defeated Japan (3-1)
 Lost to United States (0-3)
 Defeated Argentina (3-0)
Classification Matches
 5th/8th place: Lost to Bulgaria (0-3)
 7th/8th place: Lost to Sweden (2-3) → 8th place
Team roster
Philippe Blain
Jean-Baptiste Martzluff
Herve Mazzon
Eric N'Gapeth
Eric Bouvier
Christophe Meneau
Jean-Marc Jurkovitz
Laurent Tillie
Olivier Rossard
Patrick Duflos
Alain Fabiani
Philippe Salvan
Head coach: Eric Daniel

Water polo

Men's Team Competition
 Preliminary round (group A)
 Defeated South Korea (16-5)
 Lost to West Germany (9-10)
 Lost to Soviet Union (4-18)
 Lost to Australia (6-7)
 Lost to Italy (8-14)
 Classification Round (Group E)
 Defeated China (11-4)
 Lost to Greece (7-10) → Tenth place
 Team roster
 Arnaud Bouet
 Marc Brisfer
 Marc Crousillat
 Pierre Garsau
 Bruno Boyadjian
 Philippe Herve
 Michel Idoux
 Thierry Alimondo
 Michel Crousillat
 Nicolas Marischael
 Nicolas Jeleff
 Pascal Perot
 Christian Volpi
Head coach: Jean Paul Clemencon

Weightlifting

First-heavyweight 90–100 kg
 Francis Tournefier — 5th place, 385.0 kg (170.0 kg/ 215.0 kg)

Wrestling

References

Nations at the 1988 Summer Olympics
1988
Summer Olympics